Luis Antonio Marín Murillo (born 10 August 1974) is a Costa Rican former professional footballer, who played as a centre-back, and former captain of the Costa Rica national team. He is currently the manager of Alajuelense. 

Marin was regarded to be one of the finest Costa Rican footballers of his generation.

Club career
Marín was born in the Calderón Guardia Hospital in San José, Costa Rica and grew up in Concepción de Tres Ríos. He made his professional debut for Carmelita on 13 September 1992 against Alajuelense, before moving to Alajuelense themselves. In 1998, he moved abroad to play for Guatemalan side USAC alongside compatriots Try Bennett and Benjamín Mayorga and in 1999 he played in Uruguay for River Plate. In 2000, he returned to Alajuelense.

In 2006, Marín left Liga for another spell abroad, moving to Israeli outfit Maccabi Netanya. After 3 seasons with Netanya, winning a total of 113 caps, scoring 2 goals in all club competitions and becoming a fan favorite earning the nickname "superman", Marin left the club in summer 2009 for a final spell at Alajuelense. He announced his retirement in April 2011.

International career
Marín made his debut for Costa Rica in a June 1993 friendly match against Panama and earned a total of 128 caps, scoring 5 goals. He represented his country in 41 FIFA World Cup qualification matches and played in all 3 games during both the 2002 and 2006 FIFA World Cups. He also played at the 1997, 1999, 2001 and 2003 UNCAF Nations Cups as well as at the 1993,1998, 2002 and 2003 CONCACAF Gold Cups and the 2001 and 2004 Copa Américas. He also was a non-playing squad member at the 1997 Copa América.

He played his final game for the national team on 18 November 2009, where they tied 1–1 to Uruguay. The game meant that Costa Rica would not be in the 2010 FIFA World Cup. In Israel his nickname was "Superman".

International goals
Scores and results list Costa Rica's goal tally first, score column indicates score after each Marín goal.

Managerial career
After retiring in May 2011, Marín was appointed assistant to manager Oscar Ramírez at Alajuelense and was named assistant national coach for the 2014 UNCAF Nations Cup would Jorge Luis Pinto decide to resign as national team manager.

Personal life
Marín is married to Elizabeth Chavarría and they have two daughters and a son.

Honours

As a player

Alajuelense
 Primera División (8): 1995–96, 1996–97, 2000–01, 2001–02, 2002–03, 2004–05, Invierno 2010, Verano 2011; runner-up: 1993–94, 1994–95, 1997–98
 CONCACAF Champions' Cup: 2004
 Copa Interclubes UNCAF: 1996, 2002, 2005

Maccabi Netanya
 Israeli Premier League: runner-up:'' 2006–07, 2007–08

International
Costa Rica
 UNCAF Nations Cup: 1997, 1999, 2003; runner-up 2001

Individual
 Israeli Premier League Best Foreign Player of the Year: 2006–07

As a manager
 Primera División de Costa Rica: Clausura 2019

See also
 List of men's footballers with 100 or more international caps

References

External links
 
 Profile and statistics on One.co.il
 Profile on 4TheGame.com
 Article on Nacion.com
 
 
 

1974 births
1993 CONCACAF Gold Cup players
1997 Copa América players
1998 CONCACAF Gold Cup players
2001 UNCAF Nations Cup players
2001 Copa América players
2002 CONCACAF Gold Cup players
2002 FIFA World Cup players
2003 UNCAF Nations Cup players
2003 CONCACAF Gold Cup players
2004 Copa América players
2006 FIFA World Cup players
A.D. Carmelita footballers
Association football defenders
Costa Rica international footballers
Costa Rican expatriate footballers
Costa Rican footballers
Expatriate footballers in Guatemala
Expatriate footballers in Israel
Expatriate footballers in Uruguay
FIFA Century Club
Liga FPD players
Israeli Premier League players
L.D. Alajuelense footballers
Living people
Maccabi Netanya F.C. players
Footballers from San José, Costa Rica
Club Atlético River Plate (Montevideo) players
Universidad de San Carlos players
Copa Centroamericana-winning players